Jack J. Clark (September 23, 1879 – April 12, 1947) was an American director and actor of the early motion picture industry.

Biography
Clark was born on September 23, 1879, in Philadelphia, Pennsylvania. He was persuaded to enter motion pictures in 1907 by Sidney Olcott of the New York-based Kalem Studios during the silent film era. Clark traveled through 24 countries with the film company becoming one of the first American film stars to film on foreign location. While in the Holy Land, Kalem Studios produced the first passion play, From the Manger to the Cross, casting Jack Clark as John the Apostle. Clark and co-star Gene Gauntier were married during the filming, in 1912. They divorced in 1918.

During a three-year leave from the film industry in the early 1920s, Jack was instructor of dramatic arts at Villanova University. He organized a dramatic workshop and produced the mystical play Vision. About the same time he staged a pageant, Charity, with a cast of 600 persons, which established new records at the Philadelphia Metropolitan Opera House. He also wrote and produced a dramatic musical pageant, Columbus, which, with a cast of more than 1000 was staged at the Philadelphia Academy of Music for the Knights of Columbus.

In 1929, Jack Clark married Francis Rose Musolf. They remained married until his death.

Among Clark's plays were The Prince of Pilsen and 45 Minutes from Broadway. He acted in more than 200 films including The Colleen Bawn (1911), From the Manger to the Cross (1912), The Shaughraun (1912), The Last of the Mafia (1915), A Fool's Paradise (1916), Audrey (1916), Pajamas (1927), Love and Learn (1928), and Broadway Howdy (1929). Among the films he directed or produced were The Yankee Girl (1915) and The Mad Maid of the Forest (1915).

Jack Clark died on April 12, 1947 in Hollywood, California.

Partial filmography

1910

 The Conspiracy of Pontiac
 When Lovers Part

1911

 For the Love of an Enemy 
 Her Chum's Brother 
 The Little Sister
 Grandmother's War Story 
 Sailor Jack's Reformation 
 A War Time Escape 
 A Sawmill Hero 
 The Lass Who Couldn't Forget 
 By a Woman's Wit 
 The Fiddle's Requiem 
 When the Dead Return 
 The Carnival 
 In Blossom Time 
 Tangled Lives 

 The Railroad Raiders of '62 
 The Little Soldier of '64 
 To the Aid of Stonewall Jackson 
 Hubby's Day at Home 
 The Colonel's Son 
 The Romance of a Dixie Belle 
 Special Messenger 
 Rory O'More
 Losing to Win 
 The Colleen Bawn 
 The Fishermaid of Ballydavid 
 Among the Irish Fisher Folk 
 The Franciscan Friars of Killarney 
 Arrah-na-Pogue

1912

 A Southern Boy of '61 
 The O'Neill 
 His Mother 
 The O'Kalems Visit Killarney 
 The Vagabonds 
 Far From Erin's Isle 
 You Remember Ellen 
 A Visit to Madeira 
 The Kalemites Visit Gibraltar 
 Along the Mediterranean 
 American Tourists Abroad 
 The Fighting Dervishes of the Desert 
 Missionaries in Darkest Africa 
 Making Photoplays in Egypt 

 Captured by Bedouins 
 Tragedy of the Desert 
 Winning a Widow 
 A Prisoner of the Harem 
 Down Through the Ages
 The Ancient Port of Jaffa 
 Ancient Temples of Egypt 
 The Poacher's Pardon 
 From the Manger To the Cross 
 The Kerry Gow 
 The Mayor From Ireland 
 Ireland, the Oppressed 
 The Shaughraun

1913

 The Wives of Jamestown 
 The Lady Peggy's Escape 
 A Daughter of the Confederacy 
 The Mystery of Pine Creek Camp

 When Men Hate 
 In the Power of the Hypnotist 
 In the Clutches of the Ku Klux Klan

1914

 For Ireland's Sake 
 Come Back To Erin
 The Eye of the Government 
 The Little Rebel 
 Through the Fire of Temptation
 
 A Fight for a Birthright
 Marian, the Holy Terror
 Twilight
 His Brother's Wife

1915

 The Last of the Mafia 
 The Smuggler's Lass
 The Woman Hater's Baby
 The Ulster Lass

 The Mad Maid of the Forestl  
 Gene of the Northlandl
 The Little Rebel

1916

 A Fool's Paradisel 
 Audrey

 Scorched Wings  
 The Innocent Lie

References

Notes

Sources 

 Michel Derrien, Aux origines du cinéma irlandais: Sidney Olcott, le premier oeil, TIR 2013.

External links 

Jack J. Clark at IMDb
  Sidney Olcott, le premier œil

1879 births
1947 deaths
American film directors
Male actors from Philadelphia